Isoscutellarein is a flavone  found in Cupuaçu (Theobroma grandiflorum) and in the liverwort Marchantia berteroana.

Theograndin I is a sulfated glucuronide of isoscutellarein.

References 

Flavones